Alejandro Ordóñez (c. 1766 – c. 1836) was Mayor of Ponce, Puerto Rico, from 3 January 1816 to 31 December 1818. He was a teniente justicia mayor (justice major lieutenant).

Background
Ordóñez was a Spanish subject who had arrived to Puerto Rico from Venezuela with his family, plenty of cash, and merchandise and slaves. He was educated, knowledgeable on matters of business and agriculture, and with plans to grow a prosperous business. He arrived in Puerto Rico on 1815 as a Comandante Militar y Político (Military Commander and Politician) and was immediately named Subdelegado Real de Hacienda and Teniente de Justicia Mayor in Coamo. Two years later, in 1817, he became Alcalde Ordinario in Ponce. As of 1 January 1816, heads of civil government in Ponce that up to that time were titled "teniente a guerra", began to be titled "justicia mayor". However, on 6 June of that same year, they stop titling heads of local government as "Justicia Mayor" and they start naming ordinary mayors.

Mayoral term
Ordóñez is best remembered for creating the first known map of Ponce in 1818. While Ordóñez was mayor of Ponce, the municipality also ceased to depend on Coamo for governmental matters and becomes head of its own district. This meant it no longer needed to channel government matters to be heard by the Governor via administrative personnel in Coamo, but began to enjoy the benefits of a direct channel of communication with the capital.

Post mayoral life
Ordóñez is also known to have been commissioned, sometime around 1825, for the planning and opening of several downtown streets, including Calle León, Calle Aurora, Calle Amor and Calle Salud.

Legacy
There is a street in Urbanización Las Delicias of Barrio Magueyes in Ponce named after Ordóñez.

See also

 List of Puerto Ricans
 List of mayors of Ponce, Puerto Rico

Notes

References

Further reading
 Ramon Marin. Las Fiestas Populares de Ponce. Editorial Universidad de Puerto Rico. 1994.

External links
 Guardia Civil española (c. 1898) (Includes military ranks in 1880s Spanish Empire.)

Mayors of Ponce, Puerto Rico
1760s births
1830s deaths
Year of death missing
Year of birth uncertain